James Weiers (born September 8, 1953) was a Republican member of the Arizona Senate and the Arizona House of Representatives, representing various Arizona Legislative Districts. He was initially elected to the House in 1994, where he served as one of the two District 16 representatives from January 1995 through January 2003. In 2002, he ran and won the seat for the Arizona State Senate for District 10, which was similar to the prior District 16 after redistricting. He served in the Senate for one term, from January 2003 through January 2005. In 2004, he ran successfully for the House, again in District 10. He was re-elected three more times to represent the House, serving from January 2005 through January 2013. He served twice as Speaker of the House, the first time from 2001 to 2002, and the second time from 2005 to 2009.

References

Republican Party members of the Arizona House of Representatives
Republican Party Arizona state senators
Speakers of the Arizona House of Representatives
1953 births
Living people